Nicklaus Design is a company, founded and run by American professional golfer Jack Nicklaus, that designs and constructs golf courses. As of Feb 2019, the company had designed over 410 golf courses and 57 more under development around the world. These courses include Harbour Town Golf Links, Hacienda Riquelme Golf Resort in south-east Spain, and Muirfield Village Golf Club in Dublin, Ohio, where the Memorial Tournament is played. Nicklaus Design is a family business, with Nicklaus's four sons and his son-in-law all involved with the company. As of 2008, the design team included Jim Lipe and Chris Cochran.

See also
List of golf courses designed by Jack Nicklaus

References

External links 
 Official site

Golf course architects
Jack Nicklaus